Ward 7 Humber River—Black Creek is a municipal electoral division in North York, Toronto, Ontario that has been represented in the Toronto City Council since the 2018 municipal election. It was last contested in 2018, with Anthony Perruzza elected councillor for the 2018–2022 term.

History 
The ward was created in 2018 when the provincial government aligned Toronto's then-44 municipal wards with the 25 corresponding provincial and federal ridings. The current ward is an amalgamation of the old Ward 7 York West (western section), the old Ward 8 York West (eastern section).

2018 municipal election 
Ward 7 Humber River—Black Creek was first contested during the 2018 municipal election. Ward-8 incumbent Anthony Perruzza, ran against Ward 11 incumbent-Giorgio Mammoliti, and six other candidates. Perruzza was ultimately elected with 36.80 per cent of the vote.

Geography 
Humber River—Black Creek is part of the North York community council.

Ward 7 is bound on the west by the Humber River, and on the east by Keele Street. The northern boundary is Steeles Avenue (the city limit), and the southern boundary is Grandravine Drive, Black Creek, Sheppard Avenue, Jane Street and Highway 401.

Councillors

Election results

See also 

 Municipal elections in Canada
 Municipal government of Toronto
 List of Toronto municipal elections

References

External links 

 Councillor's webpage

Toronto city council wards
North York
2018 establishments in Ontario